Grand Canyon Railway 4960 is a class "O-1a" 2-8-2 "Mikado" type steam locomotive built by Baldwin Locomotive Works in Philadelphia, Pennsylvania in 1923 for the Chicago, Burlington and Quincy Railroad. Its primary use was freight service until 1957. It was spared from scrapping by the CB&Q, and was used in their steam excursion program alongside 4-8-4 class O-5b No. 5632, until the program was terminated in 1966. It was donated to the Circus World Museum, who then donated it to the Mid-Continent Railway Museum for static display. In the early 1980s, it was operated again by the Bristol and North Western Railroad before it was put into storage. As of 2023, it is owned by the Grand Canyon Railway, pulling passenger trains between Williams, Arizona and the Grand Canyon National Park alongside former Lake Superior and Ishpeming 2-8-0 "Consolidation" type No. 29.

History

Design and revenue service 
From the early 1910s to the early 1920s, the Chicago Burlington and Quincy Railroad (CB&Q) ordered a total of 388 2-8-2 "Mikado" types from Baldwin Locomotive Works to replace their aging 2-6-2 "Prairie" types in the growing heavy freight traffic. The first 60 class O-1 locomotives were built between 1910 and 1911, being numbered 5000–5059. In 1911, five E-4s, which were numbered 800–804, were delivered to the CB&Q, along with additional E-4s delivered to the CB&Q's subsidiary, the Fort Worth and Denver Railway. Subsequently, one hundred O-2s were delivered, numbered 5200–5299, between 1912 and 1913. Then, sixty O-3s between 1915 and 1919, numbered 5300–5359. In 1919, fifteen USRA-designed O-4s were delivered, being numbered 5500–5514. Then, from 1917 to 1923, a total of 148 O-1a’s were produced and delivered, being numbered 5060–5147 and 4940-4999. No. 4960 was among the last 2-8-2 locomotives constructed for the railroad on July 31, 1923. All of the locomotives were mainly used for hauling mixed freight trains, mostly around the Iowa division, for over 30 years. As diesel locomotives began to replace steam locomotives, most of the 2-8-2s on the CB&Q were reassigned, and by the end of 1957, all of them were withdrawn from revenue service. No. 4960 last saw use in revenue service by hauling coal trains out of Southern Illinois mines before it was retired from revenue service and put into storage.

Burlington Route steam program 

Throughout the 1950s, the CB&Q hosted a series of farewell to steam excursion trains pulled by a variety of their steam locomotives, most of which were sponsored by railfan clubs and groups from the National Railway Historical Society (NRHS). No. 4960 was taken out of storage to be used to pull an excursion train on December 28, 1958, with 490 passengers on board. This excursion was sponsored by the Illinois Railroad Club. After the excursion, the CB&Q's president, Harry C. Murphy, selected No. 4960 to become a permanent candidate for his steam excursion program, which would also be run by O-5b class 4-8-4 "Northern" No. 5632. The CB&Q has given No. 4960 a complete overhaul in 1961, in order to extend the locomotive's flue time. 

During the steam program, the CB&Q founded the "Steam Choo-Choo", a school field trip service where both Numbers 4960 and 5632 pulled over 120,000 school students, and this earned the former locomotive the nickname "The Teacher". In 1963, during the 50th anniversary of the railroad's service to Casper, Wyoming, No. 4960 was painted in gold, and it was consequently nicknamed the “Tenshodo Mikado” by Trains Magazine. Shortly afterward, No. 4960 was painted black again, and continued to pull excursion trains for the CB&Q between Chicago and Ottawa, Illinois. At the same time, the railroad retained one of No. 4960's classmates as a spare parts donor for the locomotive, No. 4963, which had recently been leased by the Bevier and Southern railroad. In 1965, No. 4960 was used to pull the Circus World Museum's new circus train, entitled Schlitz's "Old Milwaukee Special", on the Chicago and North Western Railroad (C&NW) mainline between Baraboo and Milwaukee, Wisconsin, and the train was witnessed by over 75,000 spectators. The locomotive returned to Baraboo to pull the train again in 1966. 

However, the steam excursion program was beginning to become harder for the CB&Q to manage, due to steam locomotive personnel becoming harder to come by, adding coal and water to the locomotives’ tenders on a dieselized railroad becoming a logistical problem, and the program, despite making a small profit, growing a financial deficit. In October 1965, Harry C. Murphy retired from his position as president of the CB&Q, and Louis W. Menk took his place. The latter had no interest in hosting steam excursion operations, so he ordered the steam program to be shut down by August 1, 1966. Several railfans protested for the program to continue, but to no avail. No. 4960 pulled the CB&Q’s last excursion train on July 17, 1966, an excursion that was fittingly sponsored by the Illinois Railroad Club, and several “Menk the Fink” buttons were sold as souvenirs during the trip. Subsequently, No. 4960, being a celebrated locomotive of the CB&Q, was donated to the State Historical Society of Wisconsin. The Historical Society decided to put the locomotive on static display at their Circus World Museum, but a light-duty bridge prevented No. 4960 from entering the museum's grounds. The locomotive was subsequently moved to the Mid-Continent Railway Museum (MCRM) in North Freedom, Wisconsin, intended for temporary storage. Employees from the C&NW provided an introduction to the art of operating the locomotive's stoker before they delivered the locomotive to North Freedom. No. 4960 then moved into the museum's yard under its own power.  

On one subsequent occasion, MCRM crews fired up No. 4960 and moved it within the yard, and it would be the only time the locomotive operated on the property. In November 1970, No. 4960 was officially donated by the Circus World Museum to the MCRM, and it subsequently remained on static display at the North Freedom yard as the largest locomotive to be on MCRM’s property. Museum members were mixed over No. 4960's presence on MCRM's property. There were members who were willing to make revenue off of it. There were also members who looked at the locomotive as an eyesore, and it was taking up space in the museum's yard, and they believed in the MCRM's initial plan to recreate an early 20th-century Midwest steam experience. The locomotive never operated on the MCRM's tourist line, since its wheelbase was too long to negotiate with the tight curves, and the trackage was too light to support the locomotive's weight.

Bristol and North Western 
After over a decade of display in North Freedom, No. 4960 was selected for restoration by Virginian businessman Harold Keene, who previously opened the Bristol and North Western tourist railroad, which was formerly used as part of the Southern Railway's Bristol branch line that lied between Bristol and Mendota, Virginia before it was abandoned and shortened to lie between Bristol and Benhams. The MCRM's management went over some disputes over whether to let No. 4960 go, or to keep it. If they had kept it, it would have produced revenue, and if they had disposed of it, there would be more space in the yard. After negotiations were settled, a five-year lease was signed in early 1980 along with an option to purchase the locomotive for $40,000, and No. 4960 began being transported to the East. No. 4960 was first moved to the Jackson Iron and Steel Company in Jackson, Ohio for an operational restoration that lasted less than one year. During the process, it was discovered that many of No. 4960’s components were in poor mechanical condition, as a result of the locomotive pulling several excursion trains on the CB&Q. Since the B&NW was a tourist operation, crews didn’t think that a complete rebuild would be necessary, so minimal repairs were made. No. 4960 was still missing its boiler jacketing, and the cylinders were missing their coverings.

No. 4960 returned to service in July 1981, and it began pulling six-hour weekend tourist trains between Bristol and Benhams. Under the lease of the B&NW, the locomotive found a new relationship with three employees: Ervin White, Gary Bensman, and Robert Franzen. At this time, White was part of the crew that moved the locomotive to Bristol and volunteered to restore it to operation along with Bensman, while Franzen was a volunteer fireman and brakeman for the railroad, and he had previously volunteered for the Southern Railway steam program. On one occasion No. 4960 derailed as she rolled over a rail line, and the B&NW crew had to call the shop crew from the nearby Tweetsie Railroad to help re-rail the locomotive and repair the trackage. At the end of 1981, Mr. Keene died. Without Mr. Keene, the B&NW would be defunct by the end of the year, and the locomotive sat idle for the next three years. Although Robert and Ervin insisted on keeping No. 4960 operable for a few months during 1984, its five-year lease with the MCRM was nearing its expiration date. In March 1985, No. 4960 was fired up to stop at the B&NW-Norfolk Southern interchange before its connecting rods were removed. This was the final time No. 4960 operated under its own power in its CB&Q appearance. It was subsequently towed 700 miles west-bound to one of Bensman's shops in Casad Industrial Park in New Haven, Indiana for storage.

Grand Canyon Railway 
In 1988, the Grand Canyon Railway, a former Atchison Topeka and Santa Fe short line between Williams, Arizona and the Grand Canyon National Park, was purchased by Phoenix couple Max and Thelma Biegert intending to reopen it for passenger service. The first four locomotives they acquired were four former Lake Superior and Ishpheming 2-8-0 consolidations, 18, 19, 20 and 29, and two of them were restored to operate there. The GCRY intended to pull ten or more passenger cars on their trackage, and they needed a more powerful locomotive to meet the demand. Ervin White, Robert Franzen, and Gary Bensman, who previously worked with the B&NW, suggested to Max Biegert that No. 4960, which was still in storage at New Haven, would be well-suited for the GCRY's need. Without much sentiment for the MCRM to keep the locomotive any longer, No. 4960 was purchased at an undisclosed cost by the GCRY on September 16, 1989, one day before the railway was reopened. In October of that year, mechanics arrived at New Haven to prepare the locomotive for movement, but Norfolk Southern prohibited it from being moved on their mainline on its own wheels, due to pits discovered in its axles. Hence, the entire running gear, along with the pilot, trailing, and tender axles, were removed and hauled by highway truck to the Norfolk Southern's locomotive shops in Birmingham, Alabama to be repaired and machined. There it was discovered that the 2nd and 3rd driving axles were so badly corroded that they needed to be completely replaced. Multiple cracks were found in the center of one driving wheel. The poor condition of the axles and wheels took several months while the rest of the locomotive remained on Casad Industrial Park's property. In the spring of 1990, Casad Industrial Park sent the GCRY a notice that they would scrap the locomotive had it not been vacated within 30 days. Subsequently, the boiler, frame, cab, and tender, were separated and hauled on flatcars to Arizona. It was a difficult decision for the mechanics, since the smokebox was badly damaged after being torched off of the frame saddle. 

By the time No. 4960 arrived in Williams, disassembled, most of its components were found to be corroded. Restoration work was finally commenced in July 1993 inside of the GCRY's Williams shops, and work was much more thorough than it was on the B&NW and more extensive than most of the locomotive’s overhauls on the CB&Q. Flues, tubes, bearings, coal systems, the front and rear flue sheets, the superheater systems, the thread bolts, and other old parts, along with any questionable parts, were removed to be repaired or replaced. New components were also being made, including a smaller smokebox, 2,400 stay bolts, a new front pilot axle, new flue sheets, and new firebox sheets, using a full penetration weld common. The components of the frame were also completely separated to be sandblasted or replaced. Since the locomotive’s original tender was in poor condition, it was replaced with a larger one from Soo Line 4-8-2 “Mountain” type No. 4005, and it was fitted with an oil tank. Robert Franzen, who became No. 4960's fireman again, was supervising the rebuilding process as welders, boilermen, and electricians worked to revert most of the components to factory-fresh condition. Gary Bensman was hired as the GCRY's chief mechanical officer for a short time before working for his company, Diversified Rail Services. Ervin White also supervised the GCRY's train operations for a short time. The restoration process slowed in 1995, due to GCRY staff concentrating their efforts on restoring Alco FPA-4 locomotives, and the process was paced up again in early 1996. The restoration process took three years and 80,000 man hours, and it cost of over $1 million. The locomotive has become so heavily modified, it now has an appearance of a 1940s era locomotive, rather than its 1920s design.

In May 1996, No. 4960 was towed out of the Williams shops to be test fired. The test firing was successful. Over a course of two months, the locomotive was repainted and given its essential components in preparation for its test run. In early July, No. 4960 moved under its own power for the first time in eleven years. The locomotive pulled its first train on the GCRY on July 27 of that year. Since then, No. 4960 has been pulling passenger trains from Williams to the Grand Canyon Village, and back. Most often, the locomotive would also be equipped with a custom-built multiple-unit control box for diesel assistance, since the GCRY decided that their longer trains would require a minimum of two locomotives to pull. In 2002, Atchison Topeka and Santa Fe 3751, a 4-8-4 "northern" based from San Bernardino, California, traveled to Williams to participate in that year's National Railway Historical Society Convention, and it performed a doubleheader with No. 4960 to the Grand Canyon, as well as a tripleheader with No. 18 back to Williams. Once the convention was complete, No. 3751 returned home, while Nos 4960 and 18 resumed to pull trains on the GCRY. In 2005, No. 4960 performed a doubleheader with No. 29, as well as posing side by side in front of the GCV log depot for a some night photo sessions.

In 2007, the GCRY was purchased by Xanterra Travel Collection. The following year they ceased steam operations on the GCRY due to fuel costs and environmental concerns, and No. 4960 was put on static display in front of the Williams Depot with its front pilot steps being removed for safety. The following year, as a result of the general public's demand for steam operations on the GCRY to return, the GCRY brought back steam to operate only two or three times per month. To reduce operating costs low, No. 4960 has been burning recycled waste vegetable oil collected from restaurants in the South Rim and Williams instead of diesel oil. This would also increase efficiency and decrease metal fatigue. Since No. 4960 has been burning a cleaner source of fuel, it was earned the nickname “The Green Machine”. In 2012, the San Bernardino Railroad Historical Society took Santa Fe 3751 for a second visit to the GCRY, where she performed another doubleheader with the 2-8-2 as part of the state's Centennial. Between 2013 and 2014, No. 4960 pulled occasional freight trains for another photo session. In 2016, No. 4960 performed another doubleheader with 29 as part of the Centennial of the National Park Service. As of 2022, No. 4960 remains operational, pulling excursions on Steam Saturdays, and is occasionally on display at Williams during the winter season. During the 2022 operating season, No. 4960 also pulled a special passenger train to honor former Trains Magazine writer Jim Wrinn who died a few months prior.

Surviving sister engines 
While No. 4960 was sold to the Circus World Museum, Nos 4963 and 5632 were sold to steam locomotive caretaker, Richard Jensen, who moved them to the Chicago and Western Indiana roundhouse for storage. In 1969, both locomotives were moved to a Chicago scrapyard, where No. 5632 was scrapped, after derailing on a switch. After Richard Jensen died in 1991, No. 4963, which was still in dead storage at a Chicago scrapyard, was acquired by the Illinois Railway Museum, who moved it to their property in Union, Illinois for static display. No. 4963 still resides there today.

Chicago, Burlington and Quincy No. 4978 was retired from revenue service in 1960 and sat idle in Galesburg for five years, until it was donated to the South County Historical Society to be placed on static display at Ottawa, Illinois. In 1997, No. 4978 was relocated to Mendota Amtrak station in front of an Ex-CB&Q caboose No. 14451 in Mendota, Illinois, where it currently remains on static display.

Chicago, Burlington and Quincy No. 4994 is the youngest survivor of the CB&Q 2-8-2s. It was retired in 1960 and sat idle, until 1964. That year, it was acquired by the Texas Tech University, who put it on display on their property in Lubbock, Texas. Since then, it has been renumbered to 401, in order to represent the CB&Q's E-4 locomotives that operated on the Fort Worth and Denver Railway.

Fort Worth and Denver No. 410 is the oldest survivor of the Burlington 2-8-2s, and it is the sole survivor of any E-4A1. It was within ten such locomotives built for the subsidiary in 1915, and it was used for freight service, until 1958. The locomotive was purchased by the Texas and Pacific Railway, and was renumbered to 400. It remained as a backup in flood protection service. When it was retired in 1963, it was donated to the City of Marshall, Texas, where it was moved to the city park and remained on static display for decades. In the 1990s, the locomotive was moved inside a steel shed, as the community grew concerns over asbestos. In 2008, the locomotive was donated to the nearby railway museum where it was subsequently moved to shortly after. It received a cosmetic restoration and is now on static display just behind Union Pacific caboose No. 25687.

See also 

Chicago, Burlington and Quincy 4000
Canadian National 3254
Grand Trunk Western 4070
Nickel Plate Road 587
Southern Railway 4501
Soo Line 1003

References

Further reading

External links 

 Grand Canyon Railway Official Website

2-8-2 locomotives
Freight locomotives
Individual locomotives of the United States
Baldwin locomotives
Railway locomotives introduced in 1923
Standard gauge locomotives of the United States
Chicago, Burlington and Quincy locomotives
Chicago, Burlington and Quincy Railroad
Preserved steam locomotives of Arizona